Rhimphalea sceletalis is a small moth in the family Crambidae that is found in Queensland in Australia and in Papua New Guinea. The species was first described by Julius Lederer in 1863.

References

External links
Image at Flickr
 - with images

Moths described in 1863
Spilomelinae